Roads in Kuwait are mostly paved. Roadways are extend up to 6,500 km, of which 4,900 km is paved. As of 2000, there were about 552,400 passenger cars and 167,800 commercial vehicles. On major roads like the ring roads, the maximum speed is 120 km/h. There are cameras on all major roads, highways, ring roads and near traffic lights. The Kuwaiti government spends nearly 450 million USD for these cameras.

Road System
 1st Ring road (also called Sabah I road): The road runs mainly in Kuwait City and starts from near Souq Sharq and ends at Sheraton Circle.
 2nd Ring road (also called Khalid Yousef Al-Marzouq road): Starts at the east side of Gulf road and ends at the Gulf road port area.
 3rd Ring road (also called Abdullah Al-Mutawaa road): Begins at Gulf road and ends near Green Island.
 4th Ring road (also called Hussien Al-Roumi road): Starts in Salmiya, runs through Shuwaikh & Al-Rai and ends at the government maternity hospital.
 5th Ring road (also called Zayed bin Sultan Al Nahyan road): Begins from the gulf road in Salmiya and ends at Jahra. It is the longest ring road.
 6th Ring road (also called Jassem Al-Kharafi road): Down at the end of the gulf road is the sixth ring road, which begins when it intersects Highway 30. The road ends at Jahra.
 7th Ring road (also called Sultan Qaboos road): Starts from Abu Fatira when Coastal road meets with Fahaheel Motorway. The road ends at Sulaibya.
 Highway 30 & 40 (also called King Abdulaziz road and King Fahd road respectively): Runs parallel to each other. It serves Mahboula, Ahmadi and Fintas. The road helps the residents of the towns to go to Kuwait City. Later, the road joins and heads towards to Saudi Arabia. It is used to get to Bahrain.
There are other Highways which intersect the ring roads like Highway 50, 55, 60, 70, 80 (Highway of Death), 85 and 801.  Many ring roads are connected to highways...

References

See also

 Transport in Kuwait